Mostafa Hashemitaba (born 22 May 1946) is an Iranian reformist politician. Hashemitaba served as Iran's minister of industries and vice president, as well as head of National Olympic Committee of Iran. He is described as having 'centrist' views.

He was a candidate in the 2001 Iranian presidential election, and was placed 10th. He was also a candidate in the 2017 election.

Hashemitaba is co-founder of the Executives of Construction Party and former member of its central committee, known as one of the senior figures among the party's conservative faction. In 2017, Tasnim News Agency wrote that Hashemitaba has not been active in the party since about ten years ago. He focuses on the environment in campaign speeches.

Hashemitaba made a cameo in the film Jang Athar in 1980.

Electoral history

References 

1946 births
Living people
Heads of Physical Education Organization
Executives of Construction Party politicians
Candidates in the 2001 Iranian presidential election
Textile engineers
Politicians from Isfahan
Amirkabir University of Technology alumni